Running Out of Luck is a 1985 American adventure film directed  by  	Julien Temple  and starring  Mick Jagger.

Plot 
Mick (Mick Jagger) is in Rio shooting a video. He is with his wife/girlfriend played by Jerry Hall. Mick performs Half a Loaf while the director, played by Dennis Hopper, screams and yells at Mick who is drunk. Mick and Jerry Hall are trying to make each other jealous. Jerry starts making out with a cabana boy which makes Mick disturbed. Mick picks up three girls and invites them to his trailer. On the way to the trailer, Mick starts feeling up the girls and realizes that they are not girls, and the three female imposters beat up and rob Mick and throw him in the back of a truck. Jerry Hall leaves Rio alone and meets a rich man in first class while Mick has found himself lost in the countryside of Brazil, seeing mirages and going crazy from the heat.

Mick is found by a plantation owner woman who rescues him and puts him to work. She also uses Mick as her sex slave. A truckload of prostitutes come to visit the plantation workers and Mick offers his shoes to a man who is roughing up a prostitute played by Rae Dawn Chong (daughter of Tommy Chong of Cheech & Chong fame). Mick escapes the plantation by dressing up in drag and getting on the back of the truck when the prostitutes leave.

They try to get money by cheating at a casino back in Rio, and Mick got caught and thrown in jail. Rae helps him escape by drugging the warden and Mick goes back to London. Although everyone thinks Mick is dead, the press catch on to his return as he makes new music with a new band upstairs in a pub.

Cast 
 Mick Jagger as Mick
 Rae Dawn Chong as Slave Girl
 Dennis Hopper as Video Director
 Jerry Hall as herself  
 Norma Bengell
 Grande Otelo
 Jim Broadbent

References

External links 

1980s adventure films
American adventure films
Films directed by Julien Temple
1980s English-language films
1980s American films